(also transliterated ) is an Arabic word meaning overseer, also sometimes translated by words such as watcher, controller, supervisor or observer.

The word has two major uses in the Quran.

In Urdu language, the word Raqeeb is also used for a person who is your Rival in Love. Who loves the same person you do or your Lover loves him. It is widely used in Urdu prose and poetry.

As a military term, overseer designates a military rank, conventionally considered equivalent to sergeant in other countries, and has variations such as "first overseer" etc.

Egyptian ranks

Syrian ranks

Arab military ranks
Arabic words and phrases
Names of God in Islam